Ortac is an islet in Channel Islands

Ortac may also refer to:
Ortaç, Lice, neighbourhood in the Lice District of Diyarbakır Province in Turkey
Serdar Ortaç,Turkish singer, songwriter and composer
Yusuf Ziya Ortaç, Turkish poet, writer, and politician

See also